Randall Lane (born 1968) is an American journalist and author who is the chief content officer and editor of Forbes magazine. In 2011, Lane created the Forbes 30 Under 30 list. Lane is a former editor-at-large for both Newsweek and The Daily Beast.

Career
Lane edited his college newspaper, The Daily Pennsylvanian at the University of Pennsylvania before interning with The Wall Street Journal. After leaving college, he was hired as a fact checker for Forbes, and thereafter was promoted to be a staff writer. In 1991, when he was 27, he was promoted to Washington Bureau Chief, before leaving to edit three publications, P.O.V., Trader Monthly, and Dealmaker (defunct). At Trader Monthly, a bimonthly lifestyle magazine where Lane was the editor-in-chief, Lane created a 30 Under 30 list featuring what his magazine considered the 30 best financial traders at the time. When Lane rejoined Forbes in 2011, he created the annual Forbes 30 Under 30 list of up and coming figures in multiple business sectors.

2010s 
Lane wrote a book titled The Zeroes: My Misadventures in the Decade Wall Street Went Insane. In the book, Lane laid out similarities of some Wall Street traders and Major League Baseball players in their views on the ethics of cheating. He interviewed Lenny Dykstra, about his use of steroids while playing with the New York Mets, for the book. The New York Daily News stated of the book that "Lane does a terrific job... putting things in context".

2020s 
During the COVID-19 pandemic, Lane took part in a multi-part virtual innovation summit hosted by the University of Waterloo. The New York Times identified him as one of the 922 most powerful people in the United States of America.

Personal life 
Lane was born in 1968. 
He is divorced and has two daughters. During the COVID-19 pandemic, he organized and hosted a four-week summer camp for his daughters and their friends, hiring teachers out of work due to the pandemic to instruct them in core subjects.

Controversy 
On September 16, 2020, Lane was doxxed in a Twitter rant by American musician Kanye West. West tweeted a screenshot of a phone number labeled "Randall Forbes" and wrote "if any of my fans want to call a white supremacist... this is the editor of Forbes". Twitter deleted West's tweet after 30 minutes and suspended his account for violating Twitter's private information policy. Lane had previously interviewed West about his 2020 presidential ambitions which Forbes published in July 2020.

References 

Living people
Forbes people
American male journalists
Newsweek people
1968 births